Mike Bernier (born 1968) is a Canadian politician, who was elected to the Legislative Assembly of British Columbia in the 2013 provincial election. He represents the electoral district of Peace River South as a member of the British Columbia Liberal Party. In December 2014, he was appointed as Parliamentary Secretary for Energy Literacy and the Environment for the Minister of Environment.  On July 30, 2015, he was chosen to be Minister of Education in British Columbia.

On October 17, 2016, Bernier fired the Vancouver School Board for failing to pass a balanced budget.

On May 9, 2017, Bernier was re-elected in his riding of Peace River South with 75.63% of the vote, the highest a BC Liberal has ever been elected with in provincial history and the eleventh highest across all parties in BC history. 

Bernier was reappointed Minister of Education on June 12, 2017. 

Before being elected provincially, he was served as a city councillor (2005-2008) and then the mayor (2008-2013) of Dawson Creek, BC. He previously worked for 20 years in the natural gas industry.

Electoral record

References

1968 births
British Columbia municipal councillors
British Columbia Liberal Party MLAs
Education ministers of British Columbia
Living people
Mayors of places in British Columbia
Members of the Executive Council of British Columbia
People from Dawson Creek
People from North Vancouver
21st-century Canadian politicians